The United States Peace Index (USPI) is a measurement of American States and cities by their peacefulness. Created by the Institute for Economics and Peace, the creators of the Global Peace Index, it is said to be the first in a series of National sub-divisions by their peacefulness. The USPI was created first due to plentiful data and a large amount of diversity between states for level of peace. The United States ranked 88/158 on the Global Peace index for 2012. The U.S. index was released on 6 April 2011 and the second edition was released on 24 April 2012.

Indicators
There are five peace indicators that make up the USPI. The scores for number of homicides per 100,000 people, number of violent crimes per 100,000 people, jailed population per 100,000 people, police officers per 100,000 people, and ease of access to small arms are weighted and combined to form a state's score. Maine scored as the most peaceful state both years.

Changes in peacefulness
The index also includes a map and list for changes in peacefulness from 1991–2009. States are scored in this section by percent, either positive or negative. As a nation, it says that the United States has improved in peacefulness since 1991.

Metro areas
The index also provides statistical analysis and crime, and the cost of crime, in the 61 most populous metropolitan areas. The Cambridge metro area in Massachusetts ranked as the most peaceful and the Detroit metro area as the least.

Lists

See also
Global Peace Index
Global Terrorism Index
Gun violence in the United States by state
 United Kingdom Peace Index

External links
 Interactive US Peace Index Map
 Vision of Humanity - Global Peace Index Site
 Interactive world map of the Global Peace Index
 Institute for Economics and Peace
 Uppsala Conflict Data Program, an organized violence database

References
^ All information in table from "United States Peace Index". Vision of Humanity. Retrieved 2011-04-06 and updated 2012-10-17.

^ Map of state and city peacefulness across indicators 

^ Institute for Economics and Peace 

 Ian M. Harris, Mary Lee Morrison (2012) Peace Education  pg 19
 David P. Barash, Charles P. Webel (2013) Peace and Conflict Studies  pg 556

Index numbers